Luther the Geek (Alternately spelled Luther, the Freak) is a 1989 American Horror film directed by Carlton J. Albright and released by Troma Entertainment. It stars Edward Terry in the titular role, with Stacy Haiduk and Joan Roth playing supporting roles.

Plot

A young Luther Watts has a fascination with carnival geeks. When he loses his teeth while at a geek show and has them replaced with a pair of sharp metallic dentures, he acquires a liking for human blood. He begins murdering people by biting their heads off, but is captured and placed in prison.

After being in prison for over twenty years, Luther is paroled and released. He begins roaming around his hometown, killing people by eating off their heads. Luther invades a farm, where he holds a mother and her daughter captive. Eventually, he is shot dead by the mother while inside the farm's chicken coop.

Cast
 Edward Terry as The Freak
 Joan Roth as Hilary
 Stacy Haiduk as Beth
 Thomas Mills as Rob
 Jerry Clarke as Trooper
 Tom Brittingham as Geek
 Carlton Williams as Little Luther

Production
Luther the Geek was filmed in Tampico, Illinois and Sterling, Illinois.  Edward Terry, who portrayed Luther, only stood five feet tall and weighed 160 pounds, so cameras were strategically placed to give the illusion that Luther was larger than Terry was. In addition, the elderly woman that Luther murders outside of the grocery store was, in actuality, a young woman in a wig and makeup. However, Luther the Geeks makeup artist requested to not be credited on the film.

Release

Home media
Luther the Geek was released on DVD by Troma Entertainment, as a special Director's Cut on February 22, 2005. It was later released on DVD and Blu-ray by Vinegar Syndrome on January 19, 2016.

Critical reception

Luther the Geek received mostly negative reviews from critics.

Richard Sopko of HorrorNews.net stated that the film was "aimed at only those looking to view the complete Troma repertoire", calling it "a strange mix of sadism and comedy with a low budget and little talent". VideoHound's Cult Flicks & Trash Pics called the film "[a] pointless, sadistic, stupid horror sleaze".
Dennis Schwartz of Ozus' World Movie Reviews rated the film a grade C, calling it "a thoroughly awful film that just might have an appeal to those who find the freak (Edward Terry) intriguing and don't care about the sloppy plot, terrible acting, or of how dumb it is even for the usual exploitation film.".

The film was not without its supporters.
In his book Slimetime: A Guide to Sleazy, Mindless Movies, Steven Puchalski praised Luther the Geek, saying: "Good title. Good film. And it managed to avoid being your basic slasherama with its wonderful title character." 
It was later included in Adam Lukeman's 101 Best Horror Movies You've Never Seen.

References

External links
 
 
 

1989 films
1989 horror films
1980s comedy horror films
1989 independent films
1980s slasher films
American comedy horror films
American independent films
American slasher films
Home invasions in film
1980s English-language films
Films shot in Illinois
Troma Entertainment films
Parodies of horror
1980s American films